These are the official results of the Women's 3,000 metres event at the 1994 European Championships in Helsinki, Finland, held at Helsinki Olympic Stadium on 7 and 10 August 1994.

Medalists

Final

Semifinals
Held on 7 August 1994

Participation
According to an unofficial count, 28 athletes from 16 countries participated in the event.

 (1)
 (1)
 (1)
 (1)
 (1)
 (3)
 (3)
 (1)
 (3)
 (1)
 (1)
 (2)
 (3)
 (2)
 (1)
 (3)

See also
 1990 Women's European Championships 3,000 metres (Split)
 1991 Women's World Championships 3,000 metres (Tokyo)
 1992 Women's Olympic 3,000 metres (Barcelona)
 1993 Women's World Championships 3,000 metres (Stuttgart)
 1995 Women's World Championships 5,000 metres (Gothenburg)
 1996 Women's Olympic 5,000 metres (Atlanta)
 1997 Women's World Championships 5,000 metres (Athens)
 1998 Women's European Championships 5,000 metres (Budapest)

References

 Results

3000
3000 metres at the European Athletics Championships
1994 in women's athletics